The Round Lake Logging Dam is located in Fifield, Wisconsin, United States. It was added to the National Register of Historic Places in 1981. Originally constructed in 1878, then completely restored in 1995, the Round Lake Dam is typical of the type of dam built by loggers in the early 1900s.

History
Constructed during the lumber boom of the late 19th century, the dam would open during the spring and logs were transported down the river. In 1992, the dam underwent renovation with assistance from multiple sources, including the Chequamegon-Nicolet National Forest and the historical society of Price County, Wisconsin.

References

External links

Buildings and structures in Price County, Wisconsin
Dams completed in 1878
Dams in Wisconsin
Historic American Engineering Record in Wisconsin
Industrial buildings and structures on the National Register of Historic Places in Wisconsin
National Register of Historic Places in Price County, Wisconsin
Logging in the United States